Tristeno (older name), is a village and a community of the Zagori municipality. Before the 2011 local government reform it was part of the municipality of East Zagori, of which it was a municipal district. The 2011 census recorded 71 inhabitants in the village. The community of Tristeno covers an area of 15.325 km2.

History 
Although no memories are preserved among the local population of any past Orthodox Christian Albanian presence, Albanian linguistic remnants in the local Greek speech may point that they were the first settlers of the village. This would also explain the local Aromanian name of the village given the nearby Aromanian settlement of Zagori ("Albanian village"). Kahl (1999) suggests that the village might have been a mixed Albanian-Aromanian village, while Koukoudes (2003) argues that it shouldn't be included among Vlach villages.

The Tristeno of Eastern Zagori is not known when it was created as a village. It was first recorded in a golden edict of 1319 (a type of concession) of Byzantine Emperor Andronikos II. It referred to a lord of Ioannina called Drestenikos, whose name existed at least until the last century in Ioannina.

Apparently from the name of this Byzantine honorary, the village was named Drestenikos Greek: Δρεστένικος and later Dresteniko Greek: Δρεστένικο and Ntresteniko Greek: Ντρεστένικο. Several years after the liberation of Epirus (1912-1913), in 1927 with a decree (ΦΕΚ 76/1927), it was renamed Tristeno, out of the three straits that exist above the village.

The first settlers are mentioned as shepherds from Himarra who brought their sheep for grazing in Zagori in the summer. This version is not accepted by the village's inhabitants who oppose the view that the first settlers came from Veria and were craftsmen.

See also
 List of settlements in the Ioannina regional unit

References

Sources

Populated places in Ioannina (regional unit)
Aromanian settlements in Greece